Fortress Hill Methodist Secondary School is a school located in North Point, Hong Kong Island, Hong Kong.  It is a secondary school serving students with learning difficulties.

External links
Official website

Protestant secondary schools in Hong Kong
North Point
Methodist schools